Lowndes may refer to:

People with the surname
Alan Lowndes (1921–1978), British painter
Alan Lowndes (rugby), English rugby league and union player
Christopher Lowndes (1713–1785), early settler and merchant at Bladensburg, Maryland
Craig Lowndes (born 1974), Australian racing driver
 Dorothy Margarette Selby Lowndes (1871-1950), English writer using pseudonym Dolf Wyllarde 
Emma Lowndes (born 1975), English actress
Eric Lowndes (born 1994), Irish Gaelic footballer
Geoffrey Lowndes (1898–1982), English cricketer
Gillian Lowndes (1936–2010), English ceramist and sculptor
Jason Lowndes (1994–2017), Australian cyclist
Jefferson Lowndes (1858–1893), English rower
Jessica Lowndes (born 1988), Canadian actress and singer-songwriter
Lloyd Lowndes, Jr. (1845–1905), American politician
Marie Adelaide Belloc Lowndes (1868–1947), English writer
Mary Lowndes (1856–1929), British artist
Nathan Lowndes (born 1977), English footballer
Rawlins Lowndes (1721–1800), American lawyer and politician
Richard Lowndes (disambiguation), multiple people
Robert A. W. Lowndes (1916–1998), American science fiction writer and editor
Sarah Lowndes, Scottish writer and curator
Steve Lowndes (born 1960), Welsh footballer
Thomas Lowndes (disambiguation), multiple people
Timothy Lowndes (born 1979), Australian sport shooter
William Lowndes (disambiguation), multiple people

Places
Lowndes County, Alabama
Lowndes County, Georgia
Lowndes County, Mississippi
Lowndes, Missouri, an unincorporated community in Wayne County, Missouri, United States
Lowndes Square, a garden square in Belgravia, London, England

Other uses
USS Lowndes (APA-154), a Haskell-class attack transport of the United States Navy